Duke of Mandas y Villanueva, commonly known as Duke of Mandas, is a title of Spanish nobility that is accompanied by the dignity of Grandee of Spain. It was granted along with the Marquessate of Terranova to Pedro Maza de Lizana on 23 December 1614 by king Philip III.

Pedro Maza de Lizana was the son of Baltasar Maza de Lizana, lord of Castalla and Ayora in Valencia, fief of Mandas in Sardinia, and of Francisca Hurtado de Mendoza, daughter of Luis Hurtado de Mendoza, 2nd Marquess of Mondéjar, and Catalina de Mendoza, of the Counts of Monteagudo. He descended from the male line of the Ladrón de Vilanova (or Pallás) family, Viscounts of Chelva and Counts of Sinarcas, but his father adopted the last name Maza de Lizana, of which he had no ancestry, as a testamentary condition of Brianda Maza y Carroz, a distant relative of him, who designated him as the universal heir of her vast assets.

As the 12th Duke died childless, the dukedom became vacant for 2 years until it was rehabilitated in 1884 by Alfonso XII in favour of the 12th Duke's niece, María Cristina Fernanda Brunetti y Gayoso de los Cobos, 18th Countess of Belalcázar and sister of the Duke of Arcos.

The name of the title makes reference to the Sardinian municipality of Mandas, and most likely to the nearby town of Villanova (Villanueva), both belonging to the province of South Sardinia. Although the second part of the denomination also seems to allude to one of the first holder's maternal surnames, it also might borrow it from the eponymous town in Benagéber, which was the manor of the Ladrón de Pallás family, Lords of Benagéber and Counts of Sinarcas.

Dukes of Mandas y Villanueva (1614)
 Pedro Maza de Lizana y Carroz, 1st Duke of Mandas (d. 1617)
 Juan Hurtado de Mendoza, 2nd Duke of Mandas (d. 1624), first cousin of the 1st Duke
 Ana de Mendoza, 3rd Duchess of Mandas (1598-1628), daughter of the 2nd Duke
 Alfonso López de Zúñiga Sotomayor y Mendoza, 4th Duke of Mandas (d. 1660), son of the 3rd Duchess
 Juan Manuel López de Zúñiga Sotomayor y Mendoza, 5th Duke of Mandas (1620-1660), brother of the 4th Duke
 Manuel Diego López de Zúñiga Sotomayor y Sarmiento, 6th Duke of Mandas (1657-1686), son of the 5th Duke
 Juan Manuel López de Zúñiga Sotomayor y Castro 7th Duke of Mandas (1680-1747), son of the 6th Duke
 Joaquín Diego López de Zúñiga Sotomayor y Castro, 8th Duke of Mandas (1715-1777), son of the 7th Duke
 María Josefa Pimentel y Téllez-Girón, 9th Duchess of Mandas (1750-1834), great-great-granddaughter of the 5th Duke
 Pedro de Alcántara Tellez-Giron y Beaufort-Spontin, 10th Duke of Mandas (1810-1844), grandson of the 9th Duchess

Dukes of Mandas y Villanueva (1884)

 María Cristina Brunetti y Gayoso de los Cobos, 11th Duchess of Mandas (1831-1914), great-granddaughter of the 7th Duke
 María Rafaela Fernández de Henestrosa y Gayoso de los Cobos, 12th Duchess of Mandas (1882-1979), great-granddaughter of the 8th Duke
 Ignacio de la Huerta y Fernández de Henestrosa, 13th Duke of Mandas  (1913-2001), son of the 12th Duchess
 Inigo de la Huerta y Ozores, 14th Duke of Mandas (b. 1944), son of the 13th Duke.

See also
List of dukes in the peerage of Spain
List of current Grandees of Spain
Marquess of Terranova

References

Bibliography
 

Dukedoms of Spain
Grandees of Spain
Lists of dukes
Lists of Spanish nobility